The 1998 season was the 122nd season of competitive soccer in Canada.

National teams 

When available, the home team or the team that is designated as the home team is listed in the left column; the away team is in the right column.

Men

Senior

Friendlies

Women

Senior

1998 CONCACAF Women's Championship

Friendlies

Domestic leagues

Men

United Systems of Independent Soccer Leagues 
 
Three Canadian teams (Montreal Impact, Toronto Lynx, and Vancouver 86ers) played in this league, which also contained twenty eight teams from the United States.  It was considered a Division I league in the Canadian soccer league system, and a Division II league the United States soccer league system.

Canadian Professional Soccer League 

Eight teams played in this league, all of which were based in Canada.  It was considered a Division 3 league in the Canadian soccer league system.

Premier Development Soccer League 

Three Canadian teams (Abbotsford Athletes In Action, Okanagan Valley Challenge, and Victoria Umbro Select) played in this league, which also contained 33 teams from the United States.  It is considered a Division 4 league in the Canadian soccer league system.

Domestic cups

Men

CPSL League Cup 

Toronto Olympians wins 3–0 on aggregate.

Challenge Trophy 

The Challenge Trophy is a national cup contested by men's teams at the division 4 level and below.

References

External links 
 Canadian Soccer Association

 
Seasons in Canadian soccer